The 22837 / 38 – Dharti Aaba AC Superfast Express is a Superfast Express train of the AC Express series belonging to Indian Railways – South Eastern Railway zone that runs between  and  in India.

It operates as train number 22837 from Hatia to Ernakulam Junction and as train number 22838 in the reverse direction, serving the states of Jharkhand, Odisha, Andhra Pradesh, Tamil Nadu and Kerala.

Coaches

The Train Rake has LHB coach.The Train has 18 Coaches.
 10 AC 3 Tier
 4 AC 2 Tier
 1 First AC
 2 EOG(End On Generators)
 1 Pantry Car

Service

As the average speed of the train is above , as per Indian Railways rules, its fare includes a Superfast surcharge.

Important Halts Of This Train

 Hatia
 Rourkela
 Jharsuguda
 Sambalpur
 Balangir
 Titlagarh Junction
 Rayagada
 Parvatipuram
 Vizianagaram Junction
 Visakhapatnam Junction
 Samalkot
 Rajahmundry
 Eluru
 Vijayawada Junction
 Renigunta
 Katpadi Junction 
 Salem Junction
 Erode Junction
 Coimbatore Junction
 Palakkad Junction
 Ernakulam Junction

Traction

From Hatia To Visakhapatnam,Tatanagar Loco Shed base WAP 7 Locomotive Hauls And Visakhapatnam to Ernakulam,Royapuram Loco Shed Base WAP 7 Entire Its Journey.

Operation

22837 Hatia–Ernakulam Junction Dharti Aaba AC Superfast Express leaves Hatia every Monday and arrives Ernakulam Junction on third day.
22838 Ernakulam Junction–Hatia Dharti Aaba AC Superfast Express leaves Ernakulam Junction every Thursday and arrives Hatia on second day.

References

External links
22837 Dharti Aaba AC Express at India Rail Info
22838 Dharti Aaba AC Express at India Rail Info

Transport in Ranchi
Transport in Kochi
Railway services introduced in 2016
AC Express (Indian Railways) trains
Rail transport in Jharkhand
Rail transport in Odisha
Rail transport in Andhra Pradesh
Rail transport in Tamil Nadu
Rail transport in Kerala